Alexander Ivanovich Pushkin  (7 September 190720 March 1970) was a Russian ballet dancer and ballet master. His students include Askold Makarov, Nikita Dolgushin, Oleg Vinogradov, Mikhail Baryshnikov, and Rudolf Nureyev.

References

External links
Александр Пушкин ценил Рудольфа Нуреева

1907 births
1970 deaths
20th-century Russian ballet dancers
Ballet masters
Ballet teachers
Mariinsky Ballet dancers
Russian male ballet dancers
Vaganova graduates